Kvitouli Castle is a castle in the village of Kvitouli, Ochamchire municipality, Autonomous Republic of Abkhazia, Georgia.

History 
The castle was built in the Middle Ages. The construction is situated on an estate. The castle is heavily damaged. The height of the preserved stone walls is 2–3 meters. The castle walls are in a poor physical condition and need an urgent conservation.

It was granted the status of Monument of Cultural Heritage by the National Agency for Cultural Heritage Preservation of Georgia in 2018.

See also 
Kvitouli Church of Kiachi

References

Castles and forts in Georgia (country)
Fortifications in Abkhazia